George Tsisetski (also Grzegorz Cisiecki) (born 24 November 1985 in Minsk) is a Byelorussian film director, screenwriter, dramatist and visual artist. Known for his surrealist films.

Filmography

Directed
  (Short film) (2005)
 Niewolnica (Short film) (2006)
 Veha (2006)
 Jadlo (Short film) (2007)
 Dym (Short film) (2007)
 Scena (2007)
 Mister B. Gone (pre-production) (2013)

Written
 Dym (Short film) (2007)
 Mister B. Gone (pre-production) (2013)

Prizes and awards 
2006 - Special Mention (Short Film Palme d'Or)
2007 - Special Jury Prize (Fantasporto Short Film Program)

External links
 

Belarusian film directors
Russian film directors
1985 births
Living people